Paul Marozeau (17 June 1879 – 21 February 1942) was a French architect. His work was part of the architecture event in the art competition at the 1928 Summer Olympics.

References

1879 births
1942 deaths
20th-century French architects
Olympic competitors in art competitions
People from Haut-Rhin